Giuseppe Chiapparo (born 29 December 1957) is a Belgian weightlifter. He competed in the men's flyweight event at the 1980 Summer Olympics.

References

External links
 

1957 births
Living people
Belgian male weightlifters
Olympic weightlifters of Belgium
Weightlifters at the 1980 Summer Olympics
Sportspeople from Liège Province